= International Journal of Learning and Media =

- Discipline: Education
- Language: English
- Edited by: David Buckingham, Tara McPherson, Ellen Seiter

Publication details
- History: 2009-2012
- Publisher: MIT Press
- Frequency: Quarterly

Standard abbreviations
- ISO 4: Int. J. Learn. Media

Indexing
- ISSN: 1943-6068
- OCLC no.: 244286835

Links
- Journal homepage

The International Journal of Learning and Media (IJLM) was an electronic peer-reviewed academic journal devoted to examining the relationship between learning and media. The journal was published four times a year by the MIT Press and was online-only.
